Nick Galifianakis (born July 22, 1928) is a former American politician who served as a Democratic U.S. Congressman from North Carolina from 1967 to 1973.

Life and career
Galifianakis was born in Durham, North Carolina, the son of Greek immigrants Sophia (née Kastrinakis) and Mike Galifianakis. Galifianakis attended local public schools and then Duke University, earning a bachelor's degree in 1951 and a law degree in 1953. After serving in the United States Marine Corps Reserve from October 1953 to April 1956, he was admitted to the bar and practiced law in Durham. In 1960, he became an assistant professor of business law at Duke and was elected to the North Carolina House of Representatives in 1960. Galifianakis left both positions when elected to the United States Congress in 1966.  For his first term, he represented the 5th District, which stretched from his home in Durham through Winston-Salem all the way to Stokes County on the Virginia border.  After the state was forced to conduct a mid-decade redistricting for the 1968 elections, however, he was placed in the 4th District, a much more compact district stretching from Durham through Chatham County to Raleigh.

Galifianakis sought the Democratic Party nomination for the U.S. Senate seat held by Senator B. Everett Jordan in the 1972 election, and defeated him in the primary. While Galifianakis led his Republican challenger, former television commentator Jesse Helms, by a substantial margin for most of the campaign, Helms closed the gap by tying Galifianakis to his party's presidential nominee, George McGovern, and with the late-campaign slogan, "Jesse Helms:  He's One of Us," an implicit play suggesting his opponent's Greek heritage made him somehow less "American." Galifianakis knew that McGovern wasn't popular in his state and tried to distance himself from him.  He also wasn't helped by several conservative Democrats defecting to Helms.

Ultimately, Helms pulled away and defeated Galifianakis by eight points.  Galifianakis sought the Democratic nomination for the U.S. Senate in 1974 but lost, 50%–32%, to Robert Morgan, the state's attorney general, who went on to win the seat in the general election.

Personal life
After leaving politics, Galifianakis returned to his law practice in Durham, only retiring in his mid 80s. Since 1997, a nephew of his, also named Nick Galifianakis, has been drawing the satirical cartoons that accompany the advice column "Tell Me About It" in The Washington Post tri-weekly. The column is written by the younger Nick's ex-wife, Carolyn Hax.  He is also the uncle of actor and comedian Zach Galifianakis.

References

External links

A Durham Dynamo: One man’s political career

1928 births
United States Marines
American people of Greek descent
Duke University School of Law alumni
Duke University faculty
Living people
Democratic Party members of the North Carolina House of Representatives
Military personnel from North Carolina
Politicians from Durham, North Carolina
Nick
Democratic Party members of the United States House of Representatives from North Carolina
20th-century American politicians
Candidates in the 1974 United States elections